Knut Olav Åmås (born 19 January 1968) is a Norwegian writer, editor and politician for the Conservative Party.

He hails from Odda. He holds a cand.philol. degree in philosophy, having taken his master's thesis on Ludwig Wittgenstein at the University of Bergen. He later took a dr.philos. degree on a biographical thesis about Olav H. Hauge. He has worked as a journalist in Bergens Tidende, and is from 2006 debate editor (from 2008: editor of culture and debate) in Aftenposten. He was an editor in the publishing house Universitetsforlaget from 1996 to 2001, and edited the periodical Samtiden from 2001 to 2006. In 2013 he was named in Solberg's Cabinet as State Secretary in the Ministry of Culture and Church Affairs. He is currently the Director of Fritt Ord.

Åmås is openly gay.

References

1968 births
Living people
People from Odda
University of Bergen alumni
Norwegian non-fiction writers
Norwegian biographers
Norwegian gay writers
Male biographers
Norwegian magazine editors
21st-century Norwegian journalists
Aftenposten people
Gay politicians
LGBT conservatism
Norwegian LGBT politicians
Conservative Party (Norway) politicians
Norwegian state secretaries
21st-century Norwegian politicians
Male non-fiction writers